Dudley Mansion may refer to:
 Dudley Mansion, the Wilmington home of Edward Bishop Dudley, 28th Governor of North Carolina
 Dudley mansion, an improvised shack in the Dudley Flats locality, Melbourne, Australia